Ghusar is a riverside village in north-west Tajikistan. It is located in Sughd Region. It is the seat of the jamoat Loiq Sherali in the city of Panjakent.

References

Populated places in Sughd Region